The Romanian Carpathians are a section of the Carpathian Mountains, within the borders of modern Romania. The Carpathians are a "subsystem" of the Alps-Himalaya System and are further divided into "provinces" and "subprovinces". 

This is an overview of the geological subdivisions of the Romanian section of the Carpathian Mountains. The broadest divisions are shown in the map on the right. The last level of the division, i.e. the actual mountain ranges and basins, is usually called "units". The lowest-level detail for those units is maintained on separate pages.

Naming conventions
Traditional Romanian naming conventions differ from this list.  In Romania, it is usual to divide the Eastern Carpathians in Romanian territory into three geographical groups (North, Centre, South), instead in Outer and Inner Eastern Carpathians.

The Transylvanian Plateau is encircled by, and geologically a part of, the Carpathians, but it is not a mountainous region and its inclusion is disputed in some sources. Its features are included below.  

The Outer Carpathian Depressions lay outside the broad arc of the entire formation and are usually listed as part of the individual divisions of the Carpathian Mountains, i.e. of Western Carpathians, Eastern Carpathians etc.

Romanian divisions
The Romanian Carpathians chain is classified, according to the geomorphological and geological differences, into three major morphotectonic units:
 Eastern Romanian Carpathians (Carpații Orientali) - with 3 main groups subdivided into 40 mountain groups
 Southern Carpathians (Carpații Meridionali) - with 4 main groups subdivided into 24 mountain groups 
 Western Romanian Carpathians (Carpații Occidentali Românești) - with 3 main groups subdivided into 18 mountain groups

Eastern Romanian Carpathians

Romanian classification

The Eastern Carpathians are divided into three geographical groups; the Romanian approach is shown by adding the following abbreviations to the names of units within Romania:
 MMB = Maramureș-Bukovinian Carpathians (Munții Carpați ai Maramureșului și Bucovinei) (North group)
 MMT = Moldavian-Transylvanian Carpathians (Munții Carpați Moldo-Transilvani) (Centre group)
 MC = Curvature Carpathians (Munții Carpați de Curbură) (South group)

Other classification

 Outer Eastern Carpathians
 Moldavian-Muntenian Carpathians
 Inner Eastern Carpathians
 "Volcanic Ridge" (the Romanian portion of the Vihorlat-Gutin Area group)
 Bistrița Mountains
 Căliman-Harghita Mountains
 Giurgeu-Brașov Depression

Southern Romanian Carpathians

 Bucegi Mountains Group
 Făgăraș Mountains group
 Parâng Mountains group
 Retezat-Godeanu Mountains group

Western Romanian Carpathians

 Apuseni Mountains
 Poiana Ruscă Mountains
 Banat Mountains

Transylvanian Plateau

See also
 List of mountains in Romania
 Bukovinian Subcarpathians
 Divisions of the Carpathians

External links
 Pictures and landscapes from the Romanian Carpathians

Mountain ranges of Romania
Lists of landforms of Romania
Mountain ranges of the Eastern Carpathians
Mountain ranges of the Western Romanian Carpathians
Mountain ranges of the Southern Carpathians